Snow Treasure is a 1968 American adventure film directed by Irving Jacoby and starring James Franciscus, Ilona Rodgers and Tor Stokke. It is based on the 1942 novel Snow Treasure by Marie McSwigan, set during the German occupation of Norway during World War II.

It was shot in Norway. The film's sets were designed by the art director Grethe Hejer.

Plot

Cast
 James Franciscus as 2nd Lt. H. Kalasch
 Ilona Rodgers as Bente Nielsen, Victor's Girl 
 Tor Stokke as Lars Lundstrom, Peter's Father 
 Roald Øyen as Victor Lundstrom 
 Paul Austad as Peter Lundstrom 
 Tina Austad as Peter's Sister 
 Wilfred Breistrand as Captain Kantzeler 
 Randi Kolstad as Inger Lundstrom, Peter's Mother

References

Bibliography
 Goble, Alan. The Complete Index to Literary Sources in Film. Walter de Gruyter, 1999.

External links
 

1968 films
1968 adventure films
American adventure films
Allied Artists films
Films based on American novels
1960s English-language films
1960s American films